Roger Douglas King (born 26 October 1943) is an English Conservative Party politician who served as a Member of Parliament from 1983 to 1992.

Political career
King first stood for Parliament at Cannock in the 1974 General Election, but he was beaten by Labour's Gwilym Roberts.

He was elected for Birmingham Northfield in the 1983 election, reversing a by-election loss to Labour the previous year. From 9 June 1983 to 15 May 1987, he served on the Transport Select Committee.

He served until the 1992 election when he himself lost the seat to Labour's Richard Burden.

See also
The Times Guide to the House of Commons, Times Newspapers Ltd, 1983 and 1992

References 

1943 births
Living people
Place of birth missing (living people)
Conservative Party (UK) MPs for English constituencies
UK MPs 1983–1987
UK MPs 1987–1992